Fruit bats, also known as flying foxes or megabats, are the 197 species of bats that make up the suborder Megachiroptera, found throughout the tropics of Africa, Asia, and Oceania, of which 186 are extant. The suborder is part of the order Chiroptera (bats), and contains a single family, Pteropodidae. The family is divided into between two and six subfamilies, with recent phylogenetic analysis suggesting a different classification structure of the known species than before. Bats have been traditionally thought to be a monophyletic group; according to this model, all living fruit bats and microbats (Microchiroptera) are descendants of a common ancestor species that was already capable of flight.

However, there are alternate hypotheses which conclude that bats are polyphyletic. The flying primate hypothesis was created in the 1980s stating that, based on morphological evidence, the Megachiroptera evolved flight separately from the Microchiroptera, although genetic evidence supports the monophyly of bats. This model states that fruit bats and primates share several anatomical features not seen in microbats, and are thus more closely related; for example, their brains show a number of advanced characteristics that link them to primates.

The Yinpterochiroptera is a proposed suborder of the Chiroptera based on molecular evidence consisting of the fruit bats and five other microbat families: Rhinopomatidae, Rhinolophidae, Hipposideridae, Craseonycteridae, and Megadermatidae. This model also challenges the view that the Megachiroptera and Microchiroptera are monophyletic. The other suborder consisting of the other bat species would be the Yangochiroptera.

Conventions

Conservation statuses listed for each species follow the International Union for Conservation of Nature (IUCN) Red List of Threatened Species. Species considered valid are also based on the Red List of Threatened Species unless noted otherwise in a super-scripted note. The  symbol indicates that the species's population trend is positive, the  symbol indicates that the species's population trend is negative, the  symbol indicates that the species's population is stable, and the  symbol indicates that the species's population trend is unknown.  Population trends are based on the Red List of Threatened Species. The super-scripted "IUCN" tag is a link to that species's Red List of Threatened Species page. If a species has taxonomic synonyms, a list of these is provided in the "Scientific name" column, underneath the binomial name and author, based on the book Mammal Species of the World. If a species has subspecies, a list of these is provided in the "Common name" column, underneath the common name, also based upon Mammal Species of the World.

Classification
There are between two and six recognized subfamilies of fruit bats according to various authors: Cynopterinae, Epomophorinae, Harpionycterinae, Nyctimeninae, Macroglossinae, Rousettinae, and Pteropodinae. However, the relationships among fruit bats are not resolved. According to phylogenetic analysis, the Macroglossinae and Pteropodinae are not monophyletic, and possibly also the Cynopterinae and the Epomophorinae. A new clade consisting solely of African fruit bats is supported by phylogenetic analysis, which will consist of 12 genera currently placed in several different subfamilies. Conversely, there may have been at least three separate colonization events of Africa by fruit bats. There is also controversy regarding the Southeast Asian fruit bats. Listed here are 45 genera and 197 species. Of these, the IUCN classifies 88 species as least concern, 13 as near threatened, 40 as vulnerable, 15 as endangered, eight as critically endangered, four as recently extinct, and 22 as data deficient. Seven species listed here are not evaluated. The population trends of 78 species are decreasing, 40 are stable, three are increasing, and 65 are unknown.

Family Pteropodidae
Subfamily Pteropodinae
Tribe Pteropodini
Tribe Macroglossini
Tribe Notopterini
Subfamily Nyctimeninae
Subfamily Harpyionyterinae
Subfamily Rousettinae
Tribe Rousettini
Tribe Dobsoniini
Subfamily Epomophorinae
Tribe Epomophorini
Tribe Myonycterini
Tribe Scotonycterini
Tribe Plerotini
Subfamily Cynopterinae

Subfamily Pteropodinae

Tribe Pteropodini

Tribe Macroglossini

Tribe Notopterini

Subfamily Nyctimeninae

Subfamily Harpiyonycterinae

Subfamily Rousettinae

Tribe Rousettini

Tribe Dobsoniini

Subfamily Epomophorinae

Tribe Epomophorini

Tribe Myonycterini

Tribe Scotonycterini

Tribe Plerotini

Subfamily Cynopterinae

See also
List of bats
Megabat

Notes

Footnotes

References

External links

Megabats
bats, fruit
Fruit bats